Ligusticum apiifolium is a species of plant in the carrot family known by the common names celery-leafed lovage and celery-leaf licorice-root. It resembles other carrot-like plants, bearing umbels of whitish or brownish flowers.

This plant is native to California, Oregon, and Washington, where it is found in coastal areas.

External links
Jepson Manual Treatment
USDA Plants Profile
Detail photos

apiifolium
Flora of the West Coast of the United States
Flora without expected TNC conservation status